Kiaracondong Station is the second largest railway station in Bandung, West Java, Indonesia. It is located near the Kiaracondong street (also known as Ibrahim Adjie street), on the Kiaracondong district, Bandung. The station located near the Kiaracondong traditional market and Kiaracondong fly over road.

The train station located is in Kiaracondong, on the eastern side of Bandung.

Services
This Station only serve economy class passenger train to east side of Bandung, as well as several intercity train that crossing this station from Jakarta, and several commuter train servicing destinations in greater Bandung.

Intercity Trains that use this station :
 Kahuripan, from and to 
 Kutojaya Selatan, from and to 
 Pasundan, from and to 
Several commuter trains also pass through this station :

References

External links

 PT KAI - the Indonesian rail company
 Forum Semboyan35 - Indonesian Rail fans Forum

Railway stations in West Java
Buildings and structures in Bandung
railway stations opened in 1923